This is the list of current heirs apparent to the thrones of the world as of .

List of heirs apparent

In federal monarchies

Malaysia

United Arab Emirates

Current sovereign monarchs without an heir apparent

Current federal monarchs without an heir apparent

See also
 List of current monarchs of sovereign states
 List of current heads of state and government

Notes

References

Heirs apparent

apparent
Heirs apparent